Is'thunzi is a 2016 South African teen drama series centered around a group of four girls and their everyday struggles.  Its lead actress, Thuso Mbedu, who portrays Winnie, was nominated for two consecutive International Emmy Awards in 2017 and 2018. In 2018 she won the South African Film and Television Awards (SAFTA) for Best Actress in a Television Drama. Is'thunzi is produced for Mzansi Magic by Rapid Blue.

Cast 
 Thuso Mbedu as Winnie
 Yolanda Kakabadse as Noxolo
 Makgotso Monyemorathoe as Thishiwe
 Zikhona Bali as Londi

References

External links 
 

2010s South African television series
M-Net original programming
2016 South African television series debuts
2016 South African television series endings
South African television soap operas
South African drama television series